Radley College Boat Club is a rowing club on the River Thames based in Lower Radley, Radley, Oxfordshire.

History
The club was founded in 1849.

Honours

National champions

Key
M men, +coxed, -coxless, x sculls, J junior, 16 under-16

National Schools' Regatta

Henley Royal Regatta

See also
Rowing on the River Thames

References

Sport in Oxfordshire
Sport in Oxford
Organisations based in Oxford
Buildings and structures in Oxford
Buildings and structures on the River Thames
Rowing clubs in England
Rowing clubs in Oxfordshire
Rowing clubs of the River Thames
Scholastic rowing in the United Kingdom